The House at 2212 Commonwealth Avenue, in the Auburndale section of Newton, Massachusetts, is a rare local example of domestic Gothic Revival architecture.  The two story wood-frame house was built c. 1845, and is distinguished by its board-and-batten siding, oriel window, crenellated porch decoration, and bracketing in the eaves.  It appears to be based on one of the panel's in Andrew Jackson Downing's The Architecture of Country Houses, which espoused the style.

The house was listed on the National Register of Historic Places in 1986.

See also
 National Register of Historic Places listings in Newton, Massachusetts

References

Houses on the National Register of Historic Places in Newton, Massachusetts
Gothic Revival architecture in Massachusetts
Houses completed in 1845